In the mathematics of Banach spaces, the method of continuity provides sufficient conditions for deducing the invertibility of one bounded linear operator from that of another, related operator.

Formulation
Let B be a Banach space, V a normed vector space, and  a norm continuous family of bounded linear operators from B into V. Assume that there exists a constant C such that for every  and every 

Then  is surjective if and only if  is surjective as well.

Applications
The method of continuity is used in conjunction with a priori estimates to prove the existence of suitably regular solutions to elliptic partial differential equations.

Proof
We assume that  is surjective and show that  is surjective as well.

Subdividing the interval [0,1] we may assume that . Furthermore, the surjectivity of  implies that V is isomorphic to B and thus a Banach space. The hypothesis implies that  is a closed subspace.

Assume that  is a proper subspace. Therefore 

which is a contradiction since .

See also
Schauder estimates

Sources

Banach spaces